Belarbi is a surname. Notable people with the surname include:

Abdeldjelil Belarbi, Algerian-American structural engineer and researcher
Aïcha Belarbi (born 1946), Moroccan sociologist and diplomat
Kader Belarbi (born 1962), French ballet dancer, choreographer, and director
Kamel Belarbi (born 1997), Algerian footballer
Malek Belarbi (born 1959), Moroccan-French singer-songwriter and record producer, son of Marie-Louise
Marie-Louise Belarbi (1928–2020), French-Moroccan publisher and author, mother of Malek
Mohamed Abderrahime Belarbi (born 1992), Algerian badminton player

See also
Belarbi, Algeria, town and commune in Sidi Bel Abbès Province